Terminal Ballistics Research Laboratory (TBRL) is a laboratory of the Defence Research and Development Organisation (DRDO) which comes under Ministry of Defence. Located in Chandigarh, the laboratory has become one of the major DRDO labs in the field of armament studies. TBRL is organized under the Armaments Directorate of DRDO. The present director of TBRL is Shri. Prateek Kishore.

History 

TBRL was envisaged in 1961 as a modern armament research laboratory under the Department of Defence Research & Development. It became fully operational in 1967 and was formally inaugurated in January 1968 by the then Defence Minister.

Areas of work 

TBRL conducts basic and applied research in the fields of high explosives, detonics and shock waves. It is also involved in evolving data and design parameters for new armaments, as well as assessing the terminal effects of ammunition.

Other Areas of work Include:

  Performance of armour defeating projectiles and immunity profiles
 Studies of ground shock, blast damage, fragmentation and lethality
 Preparation of safety templates for various weapons
 Studies of underwater detonics and pressure wave propagation
 Explosive forming, cladding and welding.
 Detonation dynamics of high explosives.

Projects and Products 

TBRL is responsible for the development of Explosive lenses for India's Nuclear weapons. These lenses were used on the Nuclear devices detonated in Pokhran-I and Pokhran-II. Apart from this, TBRL also develops explosives-based products for conventional military and civilian use.

 Baffle Ranges/ Practice Firing Ranges for Small Arms - TBRL is the nodal agency in India for design & development of different types of  baffle ranges for Small arms firing practice.  This has reduced the area required as compared to conventional range.  Consultancy for construction of such ranges is being provided to various units of Armed/Para-military forces.

 Indigenous Plastic Bonded Explosive - Developed and established technology for Plastic Bonded Explosives (PBX), the latest class of HE compositions with high VOD and higher detonation pressures
 Indigenous Digital Blast Data Recorder - This recorder was  developed based on a new design technique, for direct measurement of important blast wave parameters
 Indigenous Transducer for Blast-Measurement - Developed a blast pressure transducer for measuring pressures up to 14 kgm sqcm. It has a sensitivity of 1400 pc/kgm sqcm with a natural frequency of 200 kHz. These transducers are in regular production and being used by a no.  of  Laboratories. Impulse Generator : It has been developed for the simulation of impulse noise (=190 dB) and testing of artificial earplugs used by Armed Forces Medical Services
 Impulse Generator- It has been developed for the simulation of impulse noise (=190 dB) and testing of artificial earplugs used by Armed Forces Medical Services
 Bund Blasting Device (BBD) - Bund Blasting Device (BBD)Designed and developed Bund Blasting Device for breaching operation.
 Shivalik Multi Mode Grenade - Multi-mode hand grenade designed and developed with  reliability  >95%.
 Riot control Non-lethal Bullet -  TBRL has designed and developed a non-lethal ammunition in two service calibres, a 7.62 mm and .303 inch for effective control of unruly rioting mobs.
 IGLOO Magazine - A new construction technique of laced reinforced concrete construction in which continuous bent shear lacing along with longitudinal reinforcements on both faces of structure element are used for improving the ductility and energy absorbing capacity of the structure has been developed for a capacity of 5 Ton explosives.  This design is being used by a no.  of DRDO labs, Ordnance factories, DGQA  and service depots.
 Bulletproof Panels/Jackets testing - TBRL offers its expertise and specialised facilities for ballistic evaluation of bulletproof panels/helmets against various small arms ammunitions.

Technologies for Civilian use 

TBRL has developed a Non-lethal Riot control Plastic bullets for use by paramilitary forces and police, including usage for crowd control in Jammu and Kashmir manufactured by the Indian Ordnance Factories.

References

External links 
 TBRL Home Page

See also 
 DRDO

Defence Research and Development Organisation laboratories
Research institutes in Chandigarh
Research and development in India
Research institutes established in 1968
1968 establishments in Chandigarh